Mithun Jayawickrama (born 28 June 1990) is a Sri Lankan cricketer. He made his first-class debut for Badureliya Sports Club in the 2014–15 Premier League Tournament on 20 February 2015.

References

External links
 

1990 births
Living people
Sri Lankan cricketers
Badureliya Sports Club cricketers
Galle Cricket Club cricketers
Kurunegala Youth Cricket Club cricketers
Lankan Cricket Club cricketers
Sinhalese Sports Club cricketers
Place of birth missing (living people)